XStream Systems Inc. is a US-based company which develops X-ray based identification equipment for research and pharmaceutical industry applications. The company was sold to Veracity Network, Inc in 2011.

Company history

This company was incorporated in May, 2004. The technology used in XStream Systems' products was first developed at Rutgers University. The company was the first in the industry to deploy counterfeit detection equipment along the pharmaceutical distribution supply chain that could look inside any packaging and perform forensic analysis on the drug products inside. All of XStream Systems' technology, products, and services were acquired in 2011 by Veracity Network, Inc.

Areas of expertise

Products are based on Energy Dispersive X-Ray Diffraction (EDXRD), a technology also used in synchrotrons. XStream Systems' equipment verifies molecular crystal structure of materials and authenticates a pharmaceutical's composition.

External links
Veracity Network, Inc. home page
National Defense directory listing
US Department of Homeland Security Stakeholder's Conference
X-Ray Safety Academy
Pharmaceutical Processing Magazine appearance
Pharmaceutical Technology Magazine appearance
XStream Systems' XT250 System featured as Improving Security in Drug Topics Magazine
Florida Venture Capital Conference Presenting Company
XStream Systems Presents At Middle East Counterfeit Medication Conference 
XStream Systems offers leasing option for authentication system

References 

Diffraction
Technology companies of the United States
X-ray equipment manufacturers